Senza nuvole is Alessandra Amoroso's first studio album. Released on September 25, 2009, it consists of ten tracks recorded in the spring and summer 2009. The album was certified triple platinum by the Federation of the Italian Music Industry.

The album
The formalization of the album's release dates back to July 31, 2009. The disc is composed of ten tracks recorded in the summer 2009 implemented with an eleventh download able tracks from the album iTunes. In addition to the normal version, there is a limited edition of the album with a DVD, entitled A day with Alessandra. Moreover, even for those who buy the version with only the CD, there's the possibility to subscribe to the opendisc and thus have access to a range of tools, artwork, photographs and news previews. Moreover, members of the opendisc could participate in a competition for a place to Limelight, in Milan, where Alessandra has submitted the album on October 8.

Beginning Thursday September 17, the songs of Senza nuvole could be heard thanks to an initiative of MTV, which published the daily songs from the album on their site. From the September 24 the entire album was in streaming on the same site.

The album debuted at number one in the fimi charts, and remained in that position for four weeks. On October 6 Senza nuvole won the first platinum disc.

The second single from the album is the title trackSenza nuvole.

The dvd, A day with Alessandra
In addition to the CD only version is also published a limited edition containing a DVD. This DVD, titled A day with Alessandra, lets go a virtually  day with the artist of the album, in fact.

In addition to video clips of Stupida, there are video backstage on the set of photo shoots, backstage at the concert in Bari, Radionorba Battili Live, video of recording studio and an interview narrative "Alessandra interviews Alessandra", in which Alessandra interview herself trying to make her fans know her better. Furthermore, there are also a series of exclusive movies absolutely dedicated to the fans.

Track listing

Bonus Track
{| class="wikitable"
|-
!#
!Titolo
!Durata
|-
|11.
|align="left"|Bellissimo (Acoustic Version)
<small>Only for those who download the album from iTunes
• Text and music: Cesare Chiodo e Emiliano Cecere
| style="text-align:center;"|03:47
|}

Charts

Singles

Senza Nuvole Live Tour

In January 2010 began the Senza Nuvole Live Tour. The tour ended on March 13, 2010, at Padua.

Personnel
Alessandra Amoroso – vocals 
Simone Papi – Show director, musical director, keyboards 
Giacomo Castellano – Guitar 
David Pieralisi – Guitar 
Alessandro Magnalasche – Guitar 
Roberto Bassi – Keyboards 
David Pecchioli – Drums 
Ronny Aglietti – Guitar 
Luciana Vaona – backing vocals 
Setlist

 Segreto
 Ama chi ti vuole bene
 Mi sei venuto a cercare tu
 Splendida follia
 X ora, x un po'''
 Il cielo puo' attendere Bellissimo Da qui Arrivi tu Stella incantevole Find a Way If I Ain't Got You (cover of Alicia Keys)
 Respect (cover of Aretha Franklin)
 Chain of Fools (cover of Aretha Franklin)
 Almeno tu nell'universo (cover of Mia Martini)
 L'amore non è un gioco Estranei a partire da ieri Senza nuvole Immobile StupidaTour dates

Un'Estate Senza Nuvole Live Tour

On July 4, 2010, began Un'Estate Senza Nuvole Live Tour, which lead Alessandra touring throughout the summer 2010 from July 4 to September 12. The personnel was the same of the Senza Nuvole Live Tour.

Setlist
 Arrivi tu Ama chi ti vuole bene Il cielo puo' attendere L'amore non è un gioco X ora, x un po
 Segreto
 Stella incantevole
 Mi sei venuto a cercare tu
 Medley: Bellissimo, Splendida follia e Da qui
 Find a way
 Think (cover di Aretha Franklin)
 The Boss (cover di Diana Ross)
 Reach out (cover di Gloria Gaynor)
 I'll Be There (cover di Gloria Gaynor)
 Respect (cover di Aretha Franklin)
 Chain of Fools (cover di Aretha Franklin)
 Almeno tu nell'universo (cover di Mia Martini)
 Senza nuvole
 Stupida
 Estranei a partire da ieri
 Immobile
 La mia storia con te*

*This song was inserted into the setlist from the stage of Cagliari.

Tour dates

Sources

2009 albums
Alessandra Amoroso albums
Sony Music Italy albums